Val is a variant of the feminine given name Valerie / Valeria or the masculine given names Valeri, Valene, Valentine, Valen, or Valens.

Val is also a variant of the Old Norse names Vald and Valdr.

Notable people
 Val Ackerman (born 1959), American attorney, former basketball player, and  first president of the Women's National Basketball Association
 Val A. Browning (1895–1994), American industrialist, philanthropist, and third generation gun innovator
 Val Bennett (died 1991), Jamaican tenor saxophonist and jazz and roots reggae musician
 Val Demings (born 1957), American politician (US representative from Florida)
 Val Doonican (1927–2015), Irish singer
 Val Gielgud (1900–1981), English actor, writer, director and broadcaster
 Val Guest (1911–2006), British film director
 Val Harris (1884–?), Irish football and Gaelic football player
 Val Kilmer (born 1959), American actor
 Val Lewton (1904–1951), American film director
 Val Lehman (born 1943) Australian actress
 Val Mayerik (born 1950), American comic-book and commercial artist, co-creator of Marvel Comics' character Howard the Duck
 Val McDermid (born 1955), Scottish crime novelist
 Val Peterson (1903–1983), American politician and 26th Governor of Nebraska
 Val Valentino (born 1956), American magician, illusionist, and actor
 Val Venis, ring name of Canadian professional wrestler, Sean Morley
 Val (sculptor), born Valérie Goutard

Fictional characters
 Val Armorr, a comic book martial artist known as Karate Kid
 Val Pollard, in the ITV soap opera Emmerdale
 Val Toriello, in the television situation comedy The Nanny
 Val Cooper, in the Marvel Comics universe
 Valene Ewing, in the American television series Dallas
 Val Resnick, in the 1999 movie Payback
 Valentina Allegra de Fontaine, an espionage agent in the Marvel Comics universe
 Darryl's love interest on the U.S. TV series The Office
 The title character in the comic strip Prince Valiant
 A fictional race in Arcanis, a campaign setting for the Dungeons & Dragons game
 A character in the A Song of Ice and Fire series, the sister of the wife of Mance Rayder
 Val Bilzerian, in the adult animated sitcom Big Mouth

See also
 Val (disambiguation)
 Vali (disambiguation)
 Valerie (given name)
 Valery
 Valeria (given name)

English unisex given names
English feminine given names
English masculine given names